Ismael Valadéz Arce (born 14 September 1985) is a former Mexican football forward who last played for Los Cabos in the Liga de Balompié Mexicano.

He played with Los Cabos of the Liga de Balompié Mexicano during the league's inaugural season in 2020–21.

External links

References

1985 births
Living people
Deportivo Toluca F.C. players
Atlante F.C. footballers
Club León footballers
Correcaminos UAT footballers
Association football forwards
Mexico international footballers
Footballers from the State of Mexico
Liga MX players
Dorados de Sinaloa footballers
Cruz Azul footballers
Liga de Balompié Mexicano players
Mexican footballers